Sierra Leone maintains formal relations with many Western nations. It also maintains diplomatic relations with the former Soviet Bloc countries as well as with the People's Republic of China.

The government maintains 16 embassies and high commissions around the world.

Multilateral membership 
Former President Stevens' government had sought closer relations with West African countries under the Economic Community of West African States (ECOWAS). The present government is continuing this effort.

Sierra Leone is a member of the United Nations and its specialized agencies, the Commonwealth, the African Union, the Economic Community of West African States (ECOWAS), the African Development Bank (AFDB), the Mano River Union (MRU), the Organisation of Islamic Cooperation (OIC), and the Non-Aligned Movement (NAM).

Sierra Leone is also a member of the International Criminal Court with a Bilateral Immunity Agreement of protection for the US-military (as covered under Article 98).

Sierra Leone is a member state of the Commonwealth of Nations.

Bilateral relations

International disputes

Large UN peacekeeping presence ended civil war, however rebel gang fighting, ethnic rivalries, illegal diamond trading, corruption, and refugees spill over into neighboring states that are beset with their own civil disorders, refugees, and violence.

Notes

See also

List of diplomatic missions in Sierra Leone
List of diplomatic missions of Sierra Leone

References

External links
 United Nations Integrated Office in Sierra Leone
 "Ministry of Foreign Affairs and International Cooperation at the Sierra Leone Encyclopedia 2006"

 
Government of Sierra Leone
Politics of Sierra Leone
Sierra Leone and the Commonwealth of Nations